Anthonie "Tonny" van der Linden (19 November 1932 – 23 June 2017) was a Dutch footballer. A forward, he played for Eredivisie clubs DOS and Elinkwijk. In 1958, he won the Eredivisie title with DOS. Between 1957 and 1963, he capped 24 times for the Netherlands national team, scoring 17 goals.

Van der Linden died on 23 June 2017 at the age of 84.

Honours
DOS
Eredivisie: 1957–58

References

External links
 

1932 births
2017 deaths
Association football forwards
Dutch footballers
Netherlands international footballers
USV Elinkwijk players
Footballers from Utrecht (province)
People from Maarssen
VV DOS players